Spot is an unincorporated community in Currituck County, North Carolina, United States.

History
A post office called Spot was established in 1928. The community was so named on account of spot fish in waters near the town site.

References

Unincorporated communities in Currituck County, North Carolina
Unincorporated communities in North Carolina
Populated coastal places in North Carolina